Lanchester  is a village and civil parish in County Durham, England,  west of Durham and  from Consett. It had a population at the 2011 Census of 4,054.

Although there was a small drift mine on the edge of the village which closed in the 1970s, Lanchester's economy was mainly based on agriculture. It is now a residential village in which a number of housing estates have been developed since the late 1960s.

History
The earliest occupation on the site is the Roman auxiliary fort located just southwest of Lanchester (. Longovicium lay on the Roman road leading north from Eboracum (York), known as Dere Street. It is situated between the forts of Vindomora (Ebchester) and Vinovia (Binchester). The fort dates to AD 140, covers almost , and housed around 1,000-foot soldiers and cavalry. The fort foundations are well preserved, but there has only been minor excavation work carried out in 1937.

Stone from the fort was used in the construction of All Saints' Church, which has a Roman altar in its porch. It is one of many altars found in or near the fort, and was found in 1893.

Andrew Breeze has argued that the Battle of Brunanburh took place at the Roman fort of Longovicium. He interprets Brunanburh as meaning 'stronghold of the River Browney.'

Governance
An electoral ward in the same name exists. The population of this ward taken at the 2011 Census was 7,446.

Education
The schools at Lanchester include St Bede's Catholic School and Sixth Form College. The school has a nursery, an infants department and a juniors department.

Religious sites

All Saints Parish church
The main Parish church is now known as All Saints but was once called St. Mary the Virgin. The original building dates from the mid 12th Century but was extended in 1284 by Antony Bek, the bishop of Durham. The tower dates from c.1430. Features of interest include the Norman chancel arch, the monolithic columns of the nave (presumably from the Lanchester Roman station) and a Roman altar in the porch.

College of Lanchester

The parish of Lanchester was originally very large, covering sixty-eight miles². To profit from this Anthony Bek created a Deanery and College of Canons at the church in 1284 and extended it to accommodate the increased numbers of clergy. The college consisted of a Dean and seven Prebendaries who each held a share in the church's revenues. Bek created a set of statutes and ordinances for the College which were confirmed by Edward I in 1293. The church supplemented its income by monopolising the sale of religious items such as holy water to the surrounding villages.

By the 15th century, the college was falling out of use and the church fell into a poor state of repair with "gaping ruins" in the church, Deanery and the canons' houses. By the time Henry VIII dissolved the monasteries the College and Deanery were abolished and the church returned to perpetual curacy.

Other churches

The other churches within Lanchester are the All Saints' Catholic church and the Methodist Church which is centred in the heart of the village.

Notable residents

Canon William Greenwell (1820–1918), archaeologist and inventor of the Greenwell's Glory fly-fishing fly.
Dorothy (Dora) Greenwell (1821–82), poet, born at Greenwell Ford.
Henry Nicholas Greenwell (1826–91), developer of Kona coffee
George Hedley (1882-1937), professional footballer, born in Lanchester
Steven Sproat (born 1960), ukulele player
Liam McGough, Big Brother contestant

References

External links

Lanchester All Saints Archaeological Assessment
Lanchester All Saints Listed Buildings Entry
Lanchester Parish Council
Subterranea Britannica entry on Lanchester Station.
Historic England Info on Roman Fort
St. Bede's Catholic School and Sixth Form College
Derwentside College Lanchester Centre
Lanchester Bowling Club
Lanchester Community Centre

 
Villages in County Durham
Civil parishes in County Durham